Platycoryne is a genus of flowering plants from the orchid family, Orchidaceae, native to Africa and Madagascar.

Platycoryne affinis Summerh. - Zimbabwe
Platycoryne alinae Szlach. - Cameroon
Platycoryne ambigua (Kraenzl.) Summerh. - Tanzania
Platycoryne brevirostris Summerh. - Angola + Zambia
Platycoryne buchananiana (Kraenzl.) Rolfe in D.Oliver - central Africa
Platycoryne crocea Rolfe in D.Oliver  - central + eastern Africa
Platycoryne guingangae (Rchb.f.) Rolfe in D.Oliver  - central Africa
Platycoryne isoetifolia P.J.Cribb - Zaïre + Zambia
Platycoryne latipetala Summerh.  - Zaïre + Zambia
Platycoryne lisowskiana Szlach. & Kras - Central African Republic
Platycoryne macroceras Summerh.  - Zaïre + Zambia
Platycoryne mediocris Summerh.  - southern + eastern Africa
Platycoryne megalorrhyncha Summerh. - Nigeria + Cameroon
Platycoryne micrantha Summerh.  - Angola + Zambia
Platycoryne ochyrana Szlach., Mytnik, Rutk., Jerch. & Baranow  - Central African Republic
Platycoryne paludosa (Lindl.) Rolfe in D.Oliver - western Africa
Platycoryne pervillei Rchb.f. - eastern Africa + Madagascar
Platycoryne protearum (Rchb.f.) Rolfe in D.Oliver  - central Africa
Platycoryne trilobata Summerh.  - Angola + Zambia

See also 
 List of Orchidaceae genera

References 

Berg Pana, H. 2005. Handbuch der Orchideen-Namen. Dictionary of Orchid Names. Dizionario dei nomi delle orchidee. Ulmer, Stuttgart

Orchids of Africa
Orchideae genera
Orchideae